Konrad Ameln (6 July 1899 – 1 September 1994) was a German hymnologist and musicologist, who wrote standard works about Protestant church music.

Life

Childhood, youth and academic years 
Born in Neuss, Ameln grew up in Kassel and attended the humanistic Wilhelms-Gymnasium there. He took part in the First World War as a volunteer and was captured, then released in 1919. After his return he received his Abitur without an examination and began studying musicology with Friedrich Ludwig at the University of Göttingen in 1920. In 1921 he changed to Wilibald Gurlitt at the University of Freiburg. There he achieved the doctorate in 1924 with a dissertation on Geschichte der Melodien "Innsbruck, ich muss dich lassen" and "Ach Gott, vom Himmel sieh darein".

Activities 
After further studies and activity as adult education lecturer and director of various choirs in Rendsburg and Kassel, Ameln worked from 1926 to 1928 as a specialist for music at the  municipal library, and for the German central office for public libraries in Leipzig. In 1928, he became director of the Singwochen of the Finkensteiner Bund.

From 1930 to 1939 Ameln was, with interruptions, a private lecturer for Protestant church music at the Westfälische Wilhelms-Universität in Münster. Since he refused to exclude his communist and social democratic students from the final examinations in 1933, he was briefly imprisoned, as were some of his colleagues. He was then first put into temporary retirement in 1934, and moved with his family to Lüdenscheid. Ameln joined the SS on 1 November 1933 and worked there as SS-Scharführer and training officer of the Race and Settlement Office. On an application from 15 June 1937, Ameln became a member of the NSDAP (Party number 4.261.371).

At the beginning of the Second World War, Ameln volunteered for the Wehrmacht. He was first assigned to the Landesschützen-Ersatz-Bataillon VI. In April 1940 he was promoted to lieutenant in the 393rd Infantry Division. Ameln was then active for the Wehrmacht defense. In January 1945 he was a captain in the Grenadier Regiment 1001 and fell into American captivity near Enns on the Danube. He was released on May 24, 1946.

In 1946 Ameln tried to regain his former activity as a lecturer at the Westfälische Wilhelms-Universität in Münster. However, the Protestant faculty and the State church rejected this attempt. In the post-war period Ameln was again active as a lecturer, first at the Landesmusikschule in Hannover. There he edited the Handbuch der deutschen evangelischen Kirchenmusik, which has been published in numerous editions.

Ameln became known as the editor of Bach's motets, and works by George Frideric Handel and Leonhard Lechner, which were published by Bärenreiter-Verlag. On behalf of the  he published the first volume of the new Hallische Händel-Ausgabe with Alexander's Feast, HWV 75. For the Messiah of the same edition he provided a new German version.

In 1980 he was awarded the title Professor by the state of North Rhine-Westphalia.

Ameln died in Lüdenscheid at age 95.

Lüdenscheider Musikvereinigung 
In 1935, Ameln founded, together with the physician Wilhelm Boecker, the Lüdenscheider Musikvereinigung (Lüdenscheid music association) in Lüdenscheid. He was its musical director until 1973. With the beginning of the Second World War, Ameln's activities were severely restricted. After his return from American captivity in 1946, he resumed work on the music festivals.

Literature 
 Helmut Pahl: Lüdenscheider Köpfe des Kulturellen Lebens von A–Z. Lüdenscheid 2003.
 Gerhard Schuhmacher (ed.): Traditionen und Reformen in der Kirchenmusik: Festschrift für Konrad Ameln zum 75. Geburtstag am 6. Juli 1974. Kassel among others: Bärenreiter, 1974; .
 Alexander Völker, Ada Kadelbach, Andreas Marti: In memoriam Konrad Ameln. In: Jahrbuch für Liturgik und Hymnologie 34 (1992/93), S. VII–X;

References

Sources 
 Nachlass Ameln at Sängermuseum Feuchtwangen
 Nachlass Ameln at Archiv der Jugendmusikbewegung
 Nachlass Ameln at Universitätsarchiv Augsburg
 Hymnologische Sammlung Amelns in der Universitätsbibliothek Augsburg
 Privater Nachlass Konrad Ameln at Stadtarchiv Lüdenscheid (previously uncharted)

External links 
 
 

20th-century German musicologists
Academic staff of the University of Münster
Nazi Party members
SS personnel
1899 births
1994 deaths
People from Neuss